This is a list of the National Register of Historic Places listings in Grand County, Utah.

This is intended to be a complete list of the properties and districts on the National Register of Historic Places in Grand County, Utah, United States.  Latitude and longitude coordinates are provided for many National Register properties and districts; these locations may be seen together in a map.

There are 23 properties and districts listed on the National Register in the county, including 1 National Historic Landmark.



Current listings
Including those in Arches National Park, the current listings are:

|}

See also
 National Register of Historic Places listings in Arches National Park
 List of National Historic Landmarks in Utah
 National Register of Historic Places listings in Utah

References

External links

Grand